Milos Komatina (born 15 September 1984) is a Montenegrin professional basketball player for BC Timișoara of the Liga Națională. He is a power forward, and can also play center.

Komatina began playing in the 2003-04 season with the Primorje Herceg Novi team. He stayed with them through 2008 before signing with KK Mogren Buvda. His achievements include winning the 2012-13 Bosnian National Championship with BC Igokea Aleksandrovac, winning the 2013 Bosnian Cup with BC Igokea Aleksandrovac, and winning the 2013-14 Montenegrin National Championship with BC Buducnost Podgorica.

References

External links
 Miloš Komatina at aba-liga.com 
 Miloš Komatina at euroleague.net
 Miloš Komatina at fiba.com

1984 births
Living people
ABA League players
Montenegrin expatriate basketball people in Bulgaria
Montenegrin expatriate basketball people in Romania
Montenegrin expatriate basketball people in Serbia
Montenegrin men's basketball players
KK Budućnost players
KK Igokea players
KK Tamiš players
KK Zdravlje players
Power forwards (basketball)